Die Miserable is the ninth album by Canadian grindcore band Fuck the Facts. It was released on October 11, 2011, through Relapse Records.

Track listing

Personnel

Fuck the Facts
Mel Mongeon – vocals
Topon Das – guitars
Johnny Ibay – guitars
Marc Bourgon – bass, backing vocals
Mathieu "Vil" Vilandre – drums

Production
Mel Mongeon – artwork
Craig Boychuk – mixing
Alan Douches – mastering

Release history
October 11, 2011 (iTunes)
October 11, 2011 (North America)
October 17, 2011 (UK)
October 21, 2011 (Germany)
October 24, 2011 (Europe)

References

2011 albums
Fuck the Facts albums
Relapse Records albums